Joseph Dennis Parker,  (born 9 January 1992) is a New Zealand professional boxer. He held the WBO heavyweight title from 2016 to 2018. At regional level, he has held multiple heavyweight championships, including the WBO Oriental, Africa, and Oceania titles; as well as the PABA, OPBF, and New Zealand titles. As an amateur, he represented New Zealand at the 2010 Commonwealth Games in the super-heavyweight division, and narrowly missed qualification for the 2012 Summer Olympics.

Parker turned professional in July 2012 with Duco Events in Auckland, under the tutelage of Sir Bob Jones. After defeating Andy Ruiz for the vacant WBO title, Parker became the first heavyweight boxer from either New Zealand or the Pacific Islands to win a major world championship. As of October 2021, he is ranked as the world's fifth best active heavyweight by The Ring magazine, sixth by BoxRec and ninth best by TBRB. During his reign as WBO champion, he reached a peak active heavyweight ranking of third by the Transnational Boxing Rankings Board.

Early life 
Joseph Parker was born in South Auckland on 9 January 1992, to Dempsey and Sala Parker. His father Dempsey was named after world heavyweight champion American boxer Jack Dempsey. Parker grew up in the large suburb of Mangere in Auckland, and attended Marcellin College in the suburb of Hillsborough. At the age of three, he enjoyed jabbing into his father's palms and while he was still a young boy Dempsey gave him boxing gloves and a punching bag. When he was ten years old, he joined the Papatoetoe Boxing Club to pursue and learn more about the sport. He was trained by Grant Arkell and former boxer Manny Santos.

When Parker was growing up, he admired David Tua and Maselino Masoe who were from the same area as him. Parker is the middle child; he has one older sister, Elizabeth, and a younger brother, John, who is currently a professional boxer. He is of predominantly Samoan descent, with his ancestry roots going back to the Faleula Village on the main island of Upolu where his mother hails from. Both of his parents migrated to New Zealand from Samoa in the early 1980s. Parker also comes from a religious family, belonging to the Church of Jesus Christ of Latter-day Saints.

Amateur career 
Parker had success during his 66-fight amateur career, becoming a two-time New Zealand amateur heavyweight champion in 2010 and 2011, as well as winning several amateur tournaments and scoring some notable wins on the international circuit. Having his first fight at the early age of twelve, Parker grew and progressed, winning the 2009 New Zealand Golden Gloves Tournament in Palmerston North. He followed up with a second placing at the New Zealand Elite National Championships, losing to rival Junior Fa.

Parker started boxing internationally at sixteen years of age. His first international tournament was at the Commonwealth Boxing Championships in 2010 where he won silver. Parker's first major event was the AIBA Youth World Championships in Azerbaijan. He was looked after by the Australian National Team Management as his coach Grant Arkell could not afford to accompany him. He was the sole representative of his country in the quarterfinals after he beat Turkey's Yusuf Açik to face the Pan-American champion Yuniel Castro Chavez from Cuba. Parker won the bout on points, 8:1 to advance to the semifinals. There he fought Croatia's Filip Hrgović. They traded punches in a closely matched bout that saw the scores remain within one point of each other for most of the match. In the end it was the Croatian who managed to gain the upper hand in the final round and push ahead to an 8:6 victory. Despite leaving the ring nursing a nose injury, Parker won bronze. Parker then travelled to Singapore, to compete at the Youth Olympics. He won silver after defeating Jozsef Zsigmond in the semifinals. He then proceeded to the final where he lost on points against Tony Yoka of France.

After what was a busy season for Parker, he finished the year featuring in the 2010 Commonwealth Games in New Delhi. The then 18-year-old beat Canadian Didier Bence 14:7 in a fiery contest, charging home late in the third and final round when it appeared the fight was slipping away. Parker was down 7:5 on points when he landed a decisive right hand to Bence's head with one minute 15 seconds remaining. It knocked the Canadian down and effectively ended the fight as Parker registered the last nine points. Parker then advanced to the quarterfinals, losing to Tariq Abdul Haqq. The fight was tied at 7:7 after Parker landed a late punch to tie up the scores. The judges, however, gave Abdul Haqq the win by a majority decision of three of the five judges, meaning that Parker missed earning a medal.

In 2011, Parker won his first notable gold medal in Darwin, Australia, at the Arafura Games. He began with two wins by stoppage, with a first round victory in the quarterfinals over Jean Tuisamoa of New Caledonia. After winning the semifinals against Jake Ageidu, he met Emile Gineste from Tahiti in the Final. Parker had little trouble with his opponent, with the referee ending the contest in the first round. Parker continued his rise up the World Amateur standings, with further gold medal success. He opened his Chinese campaign in Guiyang at the China Open tournament, stopping Iderbat Davaalkhagva from Mongolia. In the final he was opposed by Ospanov Doszham from Kazakhstan. Parker was awarded the victory by way of a six-point winning margin. At the 50th Belgrade annual boxing tournament, Parker ended his amateur career defeating 2012 London Olympics berth winner, Johan Linde of Australia, to claim his third gold. He had previously beaten Erik Pfeifer of Germany on points to secure a place in the finals.

Professional career

Early career 
Parker made his professional debut SkyCity's Convention Centre in Auckland. Dean Garmonsway was chosen as Parker's first opponent. A Hamilton physical education school teacher and former Waikato Rugby league representative, Garmonsway had only three professional boxing bouts, amounting to two wins and one loss. The bout featured on the undercard of Godfather of All Fight Nights, Shane Cameron vs. Monte Barrett title eliminator. At the time, Parker was considered New Zealand's most promising boxer since David Tua. Parker defeated Garmonsway by technical knockout midway through the second round.

After scoring a number of consecutive victories in New Zealand and the US, Parker agreed to fight Francois Botha. Botha was known to be capable of landing a quality punch or two and had the ability to send fighters to the canvas, though Parker was considered the favourite to win. He defeated Botha in June 2013 by a second-round knockout over the former four-time world heavyweight contender.

Following his win over Botha, Parker extended his unbeaten professional record to seven wins on 10 October 2013 with a second-round knockout over Afa Tatupu at the Trusts Arena in Henderson, West Auckland. Parker secured the New Zealand National Boxing Federation title with a win marred only by a serious cut he suffered in the opening round when the fighters clashed heads. His charge responded with a flurry of punches which lowered former champion Tatupu two minutes into the second round. The pair went toe-to-toe for much of the second round before Parker's superior speed and power made the difference.

Parker started off 2014 after he defeated Marcelo Luiz Nascimento after a flurry of blows in the seventh round saw referee Brad Vocale stop the fight, although Nascimento protested the decision. Parker was the dominant figure throughout the bout and won the Pan Asian Boxing Association interim heavyweight title for his efforts. The fight, on the undercard of Wladimir Klitschko's world heavyweight title defence against Australian Alex Leapai, was Parker's eighth as a professional. Nascimento was a late replacement for durable veteran Sherman Williams.

In his next bout he defeated 39-year-old defending WBO Oriental heavyweight champion Brian Minto via seventh-round stoppage on 5 July 2014 in Auckland.

Following an easy victory over Keith Thompson in August, Parker went on to outclass 42-year-old Sherman Williams with a convincing unanimous decision. After losing, Williams continued to cause controversy after repeatedly attempting to grab the microphone within the ring and issuing a re-match challenge to Parker. He claimed that he would knock out Parker in the sixth round in a re-match. Parker was quoted saying that it was not up to him, and that they are fighters and to leave it to the judges to decide.

Parker continued his winning form after he knocked out WBO Latino heavyweight champion Irineu Beato Costa Junior in December 2014, before doing the same to Jason Pettaway in March 2015. Parker had moved to 13–0 after beating Pettaway and Costa Junior, with both victories coming from knockouts in the fourth round. Joseph retained his Pan Asian Boxing Association and WBO Oriental heavyweight titles.

Following a three-week camp as sparring partner to Wladimir Klitschko in Florida, Parker announced to fight three more bouts in 2015, re-commencing in Palmerston North on 13 June where he defeated Yakup Saglam via second-round knockout. He maintained his unbeaten record, notching his fourteenth win and twelfth by knockout while retaining his two titles.

Following the withdrawal of Japanese heavyweight champion Kyotaro Fujimoto, Parker beat replacement Bowie Tupou on 1 August in Invercargill, New Zealand, by first-round knockout. He then fought 45-year-old former world title contender Kali Meehan (42–5) on 15 October in Auckland. The New Zealand-born Australian Meehan earned his shot at the promising heavyweight after winning the Super 8 competition and beating New Zealand veteran Shane Cameron. Parker controlled the opening two rounds, en route to a third round stoppage victory, adding the WBC's Eurasia Pacific Boxing Council and WBA Oceania titles to his collection.

Parker's next two opponents were both named on 9 November 2015, with 24-year-old Daniel Martz selected for 5 December 2015 in Hamilton, followed by southpaw Jason Bergman on 23 January 2016 in Apia, Samoa.

Parker scored a first-round technical knockout win over Martz.

Parker notched his 18th consecutive win with an eighth-round technical knockout of Jason Bergman in Samoa. Far from the one or two round finishes of his more recent fights, Parker was made to work for his victory by a staunch and determined Bergman. The challenger offered very little on offense but displayed some impressive mettle in soldiering through a number of Parker onslaughts, the champion tenderising the body relentlessly in what proved to be the ideal workout against his first southpaw opponent. After twice sending Bergman to his knee in earlier rounds for the count, one particularly brutal liver shot crumbled the American, the referee had seen enough as he waved off the fight.

Rise through the ranks 
It was confirmed that Parker and Carlos Takam would fight on 21 May 2016 in an IBF heavyweight eliminator. The winner would be required to fight for the world title against the reigning champion, Anthony Joshua of Britain. Prior to the fight being announced, Parker and his handlers twice avoided fighting Takam the previous year because of the risk involved. The fight took place with Parker winning a unanimous decision after twelve rounds, in front of a vocal home crowd at South Auckland's Vodafone Events Centre in New Zealand. Two judges scored it 116–112, and one at 115–113. Takam was largely outworked by Parker, and neither threw many punches to secure the rounds.

The fight contract for Joseph Parker vs. Solomon Haumono was finally signed off on 23 May 2016. This match-up was a long time in the making, with the pair having shown interest in fighting each other in the past. Haumono's WBA Oceania and PABA heavyweight titles were initially on the line. It was hyped as a Trans-Tasman grudge match with Parker's IBF world heavyweight mandatory position on the line which attracted the attention of the Australian media and public. Parker defeated Haunono via fourth-round technical knockout.

Parker's team made the announcement of Parker's 1 October fight in late July with the tall Ukrainian-born German Alexander Dimitrenko in a 12-round bout at the Vodafone Events Centre in Manukau, the same venue Parker secured a points win over Carlos Takam to secure the IBF number one mandatory position in May. Trainer Kevin Barry commented that the Dimitrenko bout was a preparation for his eventual heavyweight title fight with Anthony Joshua. Parker started off strong knocking down Dimitrenko in round one. He then used his speed in round two and knocked Dimitrenko down twice following right hands. Dimitrenko was knocked down a final time in round three; as he was falling, Parker hit another body shot, which the referee appeared to miss. The fight was called off 1 minute and 36 seconds into round three.

WBO heavyweight champion

Parker vs. Ruiz 

In late October, the Parker versus Andy Ruiz title fight had been officially sanctioned by the WBO. The organisation had granted permission to Parker fighting Andy Ruiz for their belt with their championship committee voting unanimously in favor of the title fight. The belt was vacated by Tyson Fury, who was battling depression and drug issues and had not fought since November 2015 after defeating Wladimir Klitschko for the WBA, IBF, and WBO titles. Although the WBO president Francisco Varcarcel said his preference was to set up a four-man box-off for the vacant title involving the four leading available contenders for their belt but it had gone down the route of their own rules book which gave number one ranked Parker the first rights to challenge. With number two ranked Klitschko targeting the WBA belt it cleared the way for number three Ruiz to step up against Parker.

Discussions and negotiations began after Fury was expected to be stripped of his WBO belt over inactivity and testing positive for cocaine. With his sudden announcement that he would relinquish his various heavyweight world title belts due to his issues with various problems, it was unclear exactly how the WBO and WBA would go about filling the vacancies. But before Fury vacated, Duco Events promoter Dean Lonergan announced in early October he had been negotiating an alternative WBO title fight against Andy Ruiz, suggesting he had a chance of reaching a deal with Bob Arum. He pointed out that WBO rules stated that the two best-classified contenders will challenge for the title. Arum told ESPN.com that he was in talks with the WBO about making it for the vacant title. He also said his experience dealing with Parker and his team has so far been a pleasure.

Parker became the first heavyweight boxer from New Zealand to win a world title as he won via majority decision. Two of the judges scored it 115–113 in favour of Parker as the third judge scored it a 114–114 draw. Parker said it was a dream come true. Ruiz started off the better boxer and was the main aggressor throughout the fight. Parker picked up the pace in the middle rounds winning most of them but Ruiz got back into the fight during the championship rounds. Both boxers showed great respect for each other throughout the bout. Ruiz spoke of his unhappiness stating he felt he won the fight or even deserved a draw and wanted a rematch. Parker was in favour of a rematch in the future; however, on 29 December David Higgins from Duco ruled it out.

Parker vs. Cojanu 
In December 2016, David Haye was made mandatory challenger for Parker's world title, however, he chose to fight cruiserweight Tony Bellew in a heavyweight grudge match on pay-per-view. This pushed Hughie Fury to become next in line for a title shot. As speculation grew, confirmation of the Parker versus Fury fight became closer after promoter Frank Warren indicated he would be announcing details of a fight in the coming week. After a deal did not take place between both fighters' promoters, the WBO ordered a purse bid to take place at their offices in Puerto Rico the following week, with the winning bidder winning rights to choose the venue and date. Parker's promoters at Duco Events won the purse bid with a winning bid of US$3,000,011, announcing the date settled for 1 April in Auckland, New Zealand.

Several issues occurred prior to the fight being announced. The date of the then proposed fight between Parker and Fury came up for discussion and was pushed forward to 6 May after Fury and team appeared reluctant to travel to New Zealand for the fight scheduled for April. It saw WBO President Francisco Varcarcel take to social media to give Fury until 25 February to finalise the bout, otherwise, he would lose his position to challenge Parker for the world championship. Higgins, from Duco Events, then confirmed the bout would take place at the Spark Arena in New Zealand on 6 May. The location was due to Parker enjoying fighting in front of his Kiwi fans. Months up to the fight, Fury's father and trainer Peter Fury was denied a VISA entry into New Zealand. This was due to his criminal past, dating back to around 1990 when he was incarcerated for 10 years for drug-related offenses. Two days later, Peter was granted a special VISA from 28 March to 10 May. But it was eventually called off after Fury pulled out claiming an injury less than two weeks out from the event. Varcarcel stated the fight was now off and the problem laid within the Fury camp. After announcing the claim it gave Parker the rights to fight whoever he wanted when we wanted as a voluntary defense out of the top 15. Răzvan Cojanu was released as Parker's replacement for the Hughie Fury bout.

Duco Events had been told by the WBO that they could pick a voluntary defence from within the organisation's top 15-ranked fighters after the controversial withdrawal of Hughie Fury. Dominic Breazeale, the American, ranked 6th with the WBO, announced on social media his interests in fighting Parker on late notice. Speculation also grew that number 14 ranked, Răzvan Cojanu of Romania would be Parker's replacement. Cojanu was involved in his training camp in Las Vegas towards the fight. WBC champion Deontay Wilder also called out Parker for a unification bout while Fury's cousin Tyson, the troubled former champion, said he'd be willing to jump in the ring. The following day it was confirmed Cojanu would replace Fury to challenge Parker for the WBO heavyweight belt. It was reported also that the fight would be shifted from Spark Arena, to the Vodafone Events Centre in Manukau.

Parker was determined to make a statement but couldn't manage that as he left his New Zealand campaign in a convincing unanimous decision. Parker out-pointed Cojanu in the first defence of his world heavyweight title. The judges scored it 119–108, 117–110, and 117–110 in a fight where Cojanu taunted him repeatedly. Parker later admitted he had problems connecting against Cojanu. But Parker's ability to keep disciplined in a fight that involved trash talk, flying elbows, clinches and head holds got him the win comfortably. After the fight, Parker said, "You can all see why we bring Răzvan into camp, we look for the best." This was said as praise, as Cojanu previously worked with Parker as a sparring partner.

After his first defense, Parker received huge criticism over his performance which saw many fighters claim they would knock Parker out, two of whom were British boxers, Tony Bellew and Dillian Whyte. Whyte said he was not impressed with Parker's performance and wanted to go head-to-head with him later in the year. Bellew, lashed out at Parker on social media, saying he could end Parker's reign as champion very quickly. Whilst Whyte hit back at Bellew's comments, saying he must wait in line.

Parker vs. Fury 

Hughie Fury still maintained his mandatory challenger position, therefore a date was organised for the fight to be rescheduled for 23 September in Manchester, England. A contract was signed by both parties and would take place at Manchester Arena. With five days out from the fight, The British Boxing Board of Control had appointed British referee Terry O'Connor, the same official in charge of Fury's last two bouts. It saw Peter Fury exchanging a foul-mouthed argument with David Higgins at the final press conference in London. It started off with Higgins approaching Fury, unhappy with the appointment of British referee O'Connor for the fight. Higgins was then ejected from the press conference by security officials. Overall, Higgins' outburst caused a referee change after it began to create noise and headlines. As of 21 September, only 5,000 tickets had been sold since the start of the week. Hennessy was hoping to have a crowd of at least 8,000 at the arena, which has a capacity of 21,000.

Parker retained his world title on fight night. The fight went the 12 round distance, with two judges scoring the fight 118–110 in favour of Parker and the third judge had it 114–114, giving Parker the win via majority decision. Parker showed Fury respect throughout the fight, having to get through Fury's jab in order to land anything. The opening six rounds saw Fury flicking his jab into thin air, which caused Parker to think twice before going on the attack. Parker started finding his shots in the latter half. Parker finished strong in the last two rounds as Fury started showing signs of fatigue. In the post-fight, Parker said, "I felt the aggression was good on my side. He was really awkward and his movement was good, but I caught him with the harder punches I felt." Fury was paid £750,000 while Parker took home £1.1 million.

Promoter Mick Hennessy, as with the rest of the Fury camp, was disgusted with the wide scorecards, "This is corruption at its highest level in boxing. I thought it was an absolute masterclass, shades of Ali. Parker wasn't even in the fight. One of the worst decisions I've ever seen." He said he would be appealing the decision. WBO vice-president John Duggan backed the decision to have Parker as the winner. He made it clear that the result would not be investigated or overturned.

Surpassing his second defence and mandatory against Fury, Parker and his management team looked at taking him over to Japan. After a post-fight interview, Higgins suggested he was looking at Japan after making a comment that there had never been a Japanese heavyweight world champion. The most likely opponent being ranked Kyotaro Fujimoto, leaving Parker to have rights for a voluntary defence.

Parker vs. Joshua 

On 7 November, it was reported that Australian boxer Lucas Browne had signed a deal to challenge Parker for his WBO title. Locations discussed were Parker's home city of Auckland or Melbourne in Australia. Browne's promoter Matt Clark stated that Browne had signed the contract and was now waiting on Parker to sign the deal. At the time, Browne was not listed in the WBO's top 15 rankings, meaning he would need to fight for a WBO regional title to get ranked. It was later reported that Parker's team were looking at Browne as a potential match-up if they failed to land a unification fight with WBA, IBF and IBO heavyweight champion Anthony Joshua (20-0, 20 KOs). According to Higgins, a date in March was being discussed with Joshua's team, however Eddie Hearn, promoter of Joshua, offered an 80–20 split, which would favor Joshua. Higgins spoke to Fairfax Media, saying the offer would need to be more reasonable, also taking into consideration the fight would take place in the UK.

Other names discussed for a Summer 2018 fight included Bryant Jennings and Alexander Povetkin. According to a Tweet from Parker on 15 November, he was offered less than half of what was paid to Charles Martin when he defended his IBF title against Joshua. The next day, Higgins told Fairfax Media that he and Hearn were still talking around a deal that would benefit all parties. Parker stated he was willing to drop to 35% of the net profit. Higgins made a final offer to Eddie Hearn on 22 November. He told Sky Sports, "It's our final bottom line decision. We feel anything less is disrespectful or a disgrace."

On 29 November, Hearn stated the fight could be confirmed within two weeks. Higgins listed Camp Nou as the potential venue. According to Hearn on 11 December, a deal was very close to being announced with the Principality Stadium in Cardiff a frontrunner to host the fight. Hearn jokingly said they were over-paying Parker, with the deal being 65–35. On 28 December, Higgins announced that a split had been agreed which would see Parker earn between 30 and 35% of the purse and the fight should take place in April 2018. Higgins stated that a rematch clause would be in place for Joshua, should he lose. In a potential rematch, Parker would get a 55% split. On 8 January 2018 Principality Stadium was confirmed as the venue for the fight. On 14 January, negotiations came to a close and the fight was officially announced to take place on 31 March in Cardiff, live on Sky Sports Box Office. In an official press release on 5 February, Showtime announced they would televise the fight live in the United States. Joshua and Parker both came in lighter compared to their respective previous bouts. Parker weighed in first at 236.7 pounds, his lightest since he beat Solomon Haumono in July 2016. Joshua weighed 242.2 pounds, his lightest since 2014 when he fought Michael Sprott. It was reported that Joshua would earn a career-high £18 million and Parker would also earn a career-high pay of £8 million.

Joshua was forced to go the distance to defeat Parker via a 12-round unanimous decision to claim the WBO title as well as retain his WBA, IBF, and IBO belts. The judges scored the fight 118–110, 118–110, and 119–109 in favour of Joshua. Many media outlets including ESPN had the fight around 116–112 with Joshua the clear winner. With going the distance, Joshua's 20 fight knockout streak came to an end. Parker used his movement well to slip a lot of Joshua's attack but in doing so did not do enough himself to win more rounds. Parker started on the backfoot in the opening rounds allowing Joshua to take the rounds. There was an accidental clash of heads in round 3, however, neither boxer was cut from this. There was another accidental head-butt in round 9 where the referee called for a short break. Joshua's tape on his left glove kept coming loose and he was ordered to go back to his corner for a re-tape. Parker suffered a cut over his left eye after Joshua accidentally elbowed him. In round 12, neither boxers engaged as much as expected with Joshua trying to track Parker down, who again, on the backfoot looked to survive the round. The fight was marred by Italian referee Giuseppe Quartarone, who kept both boxers from fighting on the inside. This mostly had a negative impact on Parker, where he was seen to have the most success. The referee was breaking the action each time both boxers were on the inside, even when they were still throwing shots. Many boxers, pundits and both the Sky Sports and Showtime broadcast team criticised the referee during and after the fight.

After the fight, Joshua explained his game plan for the fight, "My strategy in there was kind of stick behind the jab. It's one of the most important weapons. The old saying is the right hand could take you around the block, but a good jab will take you around the world. And that secured another championship belt. So I stuck behind the jab and I made sure anything that was coming back, I was switched on, I was focused and 12 rounds, baby! I thought it was hard, right?" Parker was humble in defeat and stated he would back stronger, "Today I got beaten by a better champion, bigger man. A lot to work on. It was a good experience being here. Thank you all for the opportunity to fight in this big stadium. We're gonna go back, train hard, plan again and come back stronger. No regrets, you know, take it on the chin. … So we’ll be back again." When asked what he would do different, Parker replied, "Work harder. Come back stronger, more punches. But I would love to have another go. Just back to the drawing board." During the post fight press conference, Parker's team stated the referee did not speak English, whereas Joshua and his promoter Hearn disagreed and said he spoke English fluently. Compubox Punch stats showed that Joshua landed 139 of 383 punches thrown (36.3%) and Parker landed 101 of his 492 thrown (20.5%).

The fight was shown live in the USA on Showtime in the afternoon. The live showing averaged 346,000 viewers and peaked at 379,000 viewers. A replay was shown later in the evening which saw an increase. The replay averaged 430,000 viewers and peaked at 483,000 viewers. Nielsen Media Research., who released the figures do not have the facility to measure whether the same customers that watched the live showing tuned in for the replay.

Post-title career

Parker vs. Whyte 
According to Stuff on 10 May 2018, Parker's team were looking at a potential clash against heavyweight contender Alexander Ustinov (34-2, 25 KOs), with the fight having a possible revenge factor added to it. The reason behind this being Ustinov defeating and retiring David Tua in New Zealand in 2013. Promoter David Higgins believed the fight would be a big sell. A few weeks later, co-promoter Bob Arum was negotiating a deal for Parker to fight in Atlantic City, New Jersey on 18 August against Top Rank promoted Bryant Jennings (23-2, 13 KOs). On 5 June, The Ring Magazine stated there was an agreement in principle for the fight to take place. A day later, Higgins denied the reports that the fight was agreed and said although negotiations were still ongoing with Jennings team, there was still a chance Parker could still fight Ustinov in New Zealand. On the morning of 7 June, it was confirmed that Parker would instead return to the UK for a third-straight fight on 28 July at The O2 Arena in London against Dillian Whyte (23-1, 17 KOs) on Sky Box Office. An official press conference followed a few hours later. Whyte was originally being lined up to fight either Kubrat Pulev in an IBF eliminator or Luis Ortiz in a WBC eliminator. Many fans took to social media stating their frustration around the fight being on pay-per-view. Whyte along with Dave Higgins explained their reasons as to why the fight deserved to be on the PPV platform. Three days before the fight, it was confirmed a sell-out. It was revealed that before PPV revenue, both boxers would earn just over £1 million for the fight, with Whyte receiving slightly more, being the home fighter. Despite stating he would weigh less, Whyte came in at 258 pounds, 4 pounds heavier than his previous bout. Parker weighed 242 pounds, 16 pounds lighter than Whyte, however 6 pounds heavier than what he weighed in his loss to Joshua.

Whyte won the bout via unanimous decision in a fight which saw both boxers hit the canvas. Whyte knocked Parker down twice in the fight in dropping him in rounds 2 and 9. It looked as though a short left hook dropped Parker for the first time in his career, however, the instant replay showed it was a clash of heads leaving Parker concussed with no time to recover. Referee Ian John Lewis made the count. Most of the middle rounds were mostly back and forth action with both fighters having success. Whyte was coming forward, countering and began using his jab more and Parker was mostly on the back foot, using movement and landing 2-3 punch combinations. After round 6, Whyte began to show fatigue. This did not prevent him from carrying on going forward trying to land big shots as Parker was wary of Whyte's power. Whyte also starting using roughhouse tactics after the first few rounds. This included rabbit punches, head-butting, holding and hitting and pushing Parker over the ropes. He was warned once earlier in the fight and then warned again in the championship rounds, however, no points were deducted. Parker took over in the championship rounds but was unable to put Whyte away. Parker had an explosive start to round 12, knowing he needed a knockout to win, eventually knocked down a fatigued Whyte with 20 seconds left in the fight with a right hand to the head. Whyte got to his feet and survived the remaining seconds of the fight. The three judges scored the fight unanimously 113–112, 115–110, and 114–111 in favour of Whyte. Many of the pundits ringside, which included Steve Bunce had the fight closer including those on radio, with some even having Parker as the winner. Some portion of the boxing media also scored the fight close, in favour of Parker. The Sky Sports team, which included Matthew Macklin, David Haye, Johnny Nelson and Tony Bellew, were criticized for their views. If the first knock down was ruled as a clash of heads, the decision would have been a split draw, officially making the judges scores 112–114, 114–112 and 113–113.

Standing together, speaking to Sky Sports after the fight, Whyte gave Parker credit, "He was slick and I knew he was going to fight for the first few rounds, then come back in the final few rounds. I am annoyed I slipped at the final hurdle in the last round. I was rocked and took a few." Whyte stated he would take another fight before the end of 2018 and ready for Anthony Joshua in April 2019, "I would like to fight Joshua again if he wants it. I've still got a lot to learn so I would like to get one more in before him again." Parker had no complaints and humble in defeat, "I gave it my best; the better man and I will come back stronger." Parker's trainer Kevin Barry was very vocal after the fight regarding Whyte's rough tactics, claiming he should have had points taken off.

On 3 August, it was reported that Duco Events would appeal for the decision to be investigated. The reason for this was because Parker's team believed the head clash in round 2 which dropped Parker to the canvas affected the scorecards as well as Parker's performance during the middle rounds. It is believed that Parker was having success in round 2 before the head clash, therefore had the knockdown not occurred, the round would have been scored 10–9 in favour of Parker instead 10–8 for Whyte. In a statement, Higgins said, "It's clear that the clash of heads in the second round had a significant impact on the fight. In terms of the scorecards and Joseph's performance in the middle rounds (the headbutt made a big difference). In light of what is clear evidence of a significant error by the officials, there is a legitimate question as to whether the result should stand. That's a question Duco will be asking the sanctioning bodies on Joseph's behalf." Looking at the alternative scorecard having round 2 in favour of Parker would have resulted in the bout being scored a split decision draw. Higgins later revealed they would appeal but instead work towards a rematch with Whyte in the future. Parker stated he would continue fighting for another five years.

Parker vs. Flores 
On 3 October 2018, Sky Sports confirmed that Parker would return to New Zealand for his next bout in December, with the fight taking place in Christchurch. The fight would be Parker's first in his home country in over 18 months. Parker's opponent was later announced to be American boxer Alexander Flores (17-1-1, 15 KOs), whose sole loss was to former IBF world champion Charles Martin in 2014. Speaking of the fight, Parker said, "For me, boxing is all about the challenge - and this is another big one. I know what is at stake. I need to win and win well. I need to knock him out and I will knock him out. But I can't focus on that, I need to focus on getting better, each and every time I get in the ring," Trainer Kevin Barry admitted a loss at this level would result at the end of Parker's boxing career.

Come fight night Parker demonstrated far more aggression and intent than he had for sometime and knocked out Flores in the third round.  However, the fight is marred with controversy, as Parker allegedly hit Flores below the belt several times, as he promised he would in a pre-fight interview. Barry declined suggestions the next fight would be against Junior Fa, his main rival when they were both amateur boxers.

Matchroom three-fight promotional deal

Parker vs. Leapai 
On 31 May 2019, during the Anthony Joshua vs. Andy Ruiz Jr. fight week, a press conference was held in New York in which Parker announced he had signed a three-fight promotional contract with Matchroom Boxing USA which would see him fight on DAZN. Parker told the press, his six-year deal and relationship with Duco Events had ended in March 2019. He also advised his former promoter, David Higgins, would in return become part of his management team instead. It was reported that Parker would make his third appearance in the United States against 37-year-old and former two-time world title challenger Éric Molina. The fight would take place on the undercard of Demetrius Andrade vs. Maciej Sulecki world title bout at the Dunkin' Donuts Center in Providence.

With two weeks notice, it was later revealed Alex Leapai would be Parker's new opponent after the deal with Eric Molina fell through during the signing stages. Parker went on to win his second consecutive fight after suffering back-to-back defeats with a tenth-round stoppage. Despite protests from Leapai, the referee Ricky Gonzalez stopped the fight after Parker landed seven straight punches to the head of his opponent.

Parker vs. Winters 
Eddie Hearn confirmed Parker and former WBC title challenger Dereck Chisora would fight in London at The O2 Arena on 27 October. The bout would coheadline alongside Josh Taylor defending his IBF light welterweight world title against American Regis Prograis in the World Boxing Super Series final. It was later announced Parker had been forced to withdraw from his fight with Chisora due to a spider bite that was causing problems during training. A doctor's certificate was forwarded to Hearn whom also confirmed they would find a replacement opponent for Chisora.

Parker instead returned to the ring in Frisco, Texas on 29 February 2020, where he defeated Shawndell Winters by fifth-round technical knockout. Winters was ranked fourteenth by the WBA at the time.

Parker vs. Fa 

Parker and Junior Fa fought four times during their amateur careers, with two victories and two defeats each. Their first encounter was at the 2009 Boxing New Zealand National Championships held in Rotorua. The pair competed in the super-heavyweight final, Fa defeating Parker in an 8–4 decision. A month later Parker forced a second-round standing eight count and a points win over Fa in a Samoan Tsunami Boxing appeal event at the North Shore Events Centre, organized by David Tua. On 12 June, they met for a third time in an amateur world-class contest rematch. It showcased as the main event at The Night of the Young Champions from ABA Stadium in 2010. Parker won by a large margin of twelve points.

In their fourth contest, Fa and Parker fought in a do-or-die opportunity to secure a place at the 2012 Summer Olympics during the Oceania Boxing Championships in Canberra, Australia. Parker had four opponents in the super-heavyweight division, one being Fa. Parker was eliminated, Fa claiming a closely fought three-round encounter eleven points to eight. He dropped the first round 2–1 but came back strongly in the second to secure a decisive 3-point lead that he protected when the final three-minute joust ended in stalemate.

Split from trainer Kevin Barry

Parker vs. Chisora 

Joseph Parker vs. Derek Chisora had originally been scheduled to take place on 26 October 2019, but Parker was forced to pull out after suffering a spider bite injury. After the pair's respective fights against unbeaten opponents, Junior Fa and Oleksandr Usyk, Parker and Chisora agreed to reschedule their fight for 1 May 2021, where they would fight on Sky PPV in Manchester, England for the vacant WBO Inter-Continental heavyweight title. Chisora was ranked #15 by the WBC. The day before the fight, the event looked to be in jeopardy as Chisora threatened to pull out, after losing a coin toss that meant he would have to walk to the ring first, which he objected to. The dispute was resolved on the day of the fight, and the fight went ahead as planned. On the night, Chisora started the fight strong, knocking Parker down in just seven seconds of the first round with a big right hand. He closed the distance and pressured his opponent in the early rounds, but Parker rallied back in the mid-to-late rounds, boxing well off the back foot and using his jab effectively to win a split decision, with scorecards of 115–113, 116–111 in his favour, and 115–113 in favour of Chisora.

Parker vs. Chisora II 
On 16 September 2021, it was announced that Parker and Chisora would square off in a rematch on 18 December, again at the AO Arena in Manchester, England. On the night, Parker dominated the fight, knocking down Chisora 3 times on the way to a unanimous decision. The judges scored the fight 115–110, 115–111, and 114–112, all in Parker's favour. Attention was drawn to the scorecards which were widely perceived to be overly generous to Chisora: reporters Mike Coppinger opined that "the judges were trying to rob" Parker, while Chris Mannix stated, "These are criminally — criminally — bad scorecards."

Parker vs. Joyce 
Parker returned to the AO Arena for his third consecutive fight to headline a BT Sport Box Office pay-per-view show against undefeated Joe Joyce on 24 September 2022, in a fight between the WBO's number 1 and 2 contenders for the vacant interim title. In a fast-paced bout in which both men landed power punches, Joyce was able to bloody Parker's nose and open a cut above his eye, fighting largely on the front foot and using his jab to set up his attacks, while Parker was able to work off the back foot, finding some success with the left hook and overhand right. In the eleventh round, Parker was knocked down by a powerful left hook. He was able to rise to his feet, but the referee deemed it unsafe for him to continue, halting the fight to declare Joyce the winner by eleventh-round knockout. With the result, Joyce became the first man to stop Parker, who had previously never been knocked out.

Parker vs. Massey 
Parker faced British boxer Jack Massey on the undercard of Chris Eubank Jr. vs Liam Smith, held in the AO Arena in Manchester, England. Parker won the bout by unanimous decision.

Personal life 
Parker goes by the high chief name of Lupesoliai La'auliolemalietoa. Contrary to reports that the emerging star was bestowed a matai (chief) title, the village of Faleula revealed to him the name to bestow upon him the chiefly title of La'auli. The paramount chief of the village, Loau Keneti Sio, urged him to be a "strong man". He bestowed his blessings on Parker, reminding him that the bestowed title is a gift and a "blessing to him from the village". Loau said informing him that he has been chosen to be bestowed the title La'auli is a sign of respect. It is also a thank you from the village for what he has achieved for Samoa.

Samoa Prime Minister Tuilaepa Aiono Sailele Malielegaoi awarded Parker the Order of Merit Award at the 2017 Government's Honours and Awards. He was the youngest recipient of an award at the ceremony The Prime Minister also announced the government of Samoa would host a special welcome for Parker, with a half day commission holiday.

Parker has three daughters.

Professional boxing record

Pay-per-view bouts

Filmography

Awards and recognitions 
2011 New Zealand Pacific Island Sports Emerging Talent Award
2012 Samoan Sports Junior Sportsman of the Year
2013 New Zealand Pacific Island Sports Sportsman of the Year
2015 Honoured Matai title of Lupesoliai La'auliolemalietoa
2015 World Boxing Organization Oriental Heavyweight Fighter of the Year
2015 6th Rated ESPN Prospect of the Year
2016 Order of Merit of Samoa
2017 Counties Manukau Sporting Excellence Sportsman of the Year
2017 Counties Manukau Sporting Excellence Sportsperson of the Year

References

External links 

Joseph Parker - Profile, News Archive & Current Rankings at Box.Live

Boxers trained by Kevin Barry
Living people
1992 births
Boxers at the 2010 Commonwealth Games
Boxers at the 2010 Summer Youth Olympics
Heavyweight boxers
New Zealand professional boxing champions
New Zealand world boxing champions
Boxers from Auckland
New Zealand Latter Day Saints
People educated at Marcellin College, Auckland
New Zealand male boxers
Super-heavyweight boxers
New Zealand sportspeople of Samoan descent
World heavyweight boxing champions
World Boxing Organization champions
Commonwealth Games competitors for New Zealand
Members of the Order of Merit of Samoa